The Constitution of the Duchy of Warsaw was promulgated by Napoleon on 22 July 1807 in Dresden. Together with the Napoleonic Code it was a significant reform of the Polish law and government in the new Duchy of Warsaw. The constitution provided for a bicameral Sejm and for a Council of Ministers. The new laws abolished serfdom and legal distinction by social classes (nobility, peasantry, townsfolk) by introducing the principle that all people are equal before the law. Individual liberty was guaranteed. The Duchy of Warsaw was a satellite state of France, with no diplomacy of its own. King Frederick Augustus I of Saxony became Duke of Warsaw, and had control over foreign policy; a French representative was to reside in Warsaw and had significant influence over the Duchy's government. The army of the Duchy of Warsaw was subordinate to the French Army. It was, nonetheless, considered a liberal constitution for its time.

External links
  Text of the Constitution
  Text of the Constitution

1807 documents
1807 in law
1807 in Poland
July 1807 events
Constitutions of Poland
Duchy of Warsaw
Defunct constitutions
Dresden
Legal history of Poland
Governments in Poland